Genghis Khan is a Hong Kong television series based on the life of Genghis Khan, the founder of the Mongol Empire in the 13th century. The series was first broadcast on TVB Jade in Hong Kong in 1987.

Cast
 Alex Man as Genghis Khan
 Felix Wong as Jamukha
 Sean Lau as Chilaun
 Eugina Lau as Heda'an
 Shallin Tse as Börte
 Eddie Kwan as Sangkun
 Nathan Chan as Hasar
 Ekin Cheng as Jochi
 Aaron Kwok as Nuoyan
 Michael Tao as Muqali
 William So as Sancha
 Ho Wai-lung as Bele
 Jim Ping-hei as Belgutei
 Chan Lai-see as Hoelun
 Chan Wing-chun as Tata-tonga
 Money Lo as Baihe
 Elizabeth Lee as A'zhen
 Lam Wai-kin as Jebe
 Au Wai-lam as Bogan
 Cheung Yik-ming as Borokhula
 Wu Wai-hong as Ercha
 Alan Chui Chung-San as Yesügei
 Yip Seung-wah as Menglike
 Lau Ya-lai as Suchi
 Ng Jui-ting as Bieke
 Yu Ming as Suo'er Laodie
 Cheung Ying-choi as Dei Setchen
 Ma Chung-tak as Dalitai
 Chun Hung as A'le
 Yu Mo-lin as Heichen

Music
The opening theme song of the series, Who Takes the Lead, was originally performed in Cantonese by Roman Tam and Jenny Tseng. It was sung by Carol Cheng in the Hong Kong film Her Fatal Ways II.

TVB dramas
Television series set in the Mongol Empire
Depictions of Genghis Khan on television
1980s Hong Kong television series
Cantonese-language television shows